The 1982–83 FIS Cross-Country World Cup was the 2nd official World Cup season in cross-country skiing for men and women. The World Cup started in Val di Sole, Italy on 12 December 1982 and finished in Labrador City, Canada on 27 March 1983. Alexander Zavyalov of the Soviet Union won the overall men's cup, and Marja-Liisa Hämäläinen of Finland won the women's.

Calendar

Men

Women

Overall standings

Men's standings

Women's standings

Achievements
First World Cup career victory

Men
  Jan Ottosson, 22, in his 2nd season - the WC 2 (15 km) in Reit im Winkl; also first podium
  Jan Lindvall, 22, in his 2nd season - the WC 5 (50 km) in Kavgolovo; first podium was 1981–82 WC 7 (50 km) in Lahti
  Alexander Zavyalov, 27, in his 2nd season - the WC 3 (15 km) in Sarajevo; first podium was 1981–82 WC 5 (15 km) in Oslo
  Asko Autio, 29, in his 2nd season - the WC 8 (50 km) in Oslo; also first podium
  Gunde Svan, 21, in his 1st season - the WC 9 (15 km) in Anchorage; first podium was 1982–83 WC 8 (50 km) in Oslo

Women
  Marja-Liisa Hämäläinen, 27, in her 2nd season – the WC 7 (5 km) in Lahti; first podium was 1982-83 WC 1 (15 km) in Val di Sole

Victories in this World Cup (all-time number of victories as of 1982/83 season in parentheses)

Men
 , 3 (3) first places
 , 2 (2) first places
 , 1 (5) first place
 , 1 (2) first place
 , 1 (1) first place
 , 1 (1) first place
 , 1 (1) first place

Women
 , 3 (6) first places
 , 3 (5) first places
 , 3 (3) first places
 , 1 (2) first place

FIS Cross-Country World Cup seasons
World Cup 1982-83
World Cup 1982-83